Goran Nedeljković (born 20 August 1982 in Smederevo, SR Serbia, Yugoslavia) is a Serbian rower.

He participated at the 2004 Summer Olympics and finished first in the B final of the men's lightweight four.

References

1982 births
Living people
Serbian male rowers
Olympic rowers of Serbia and Montenegro
Rowers at the 2004 Summer Olympics
World Rowing Championships medalists for Serbia
European Rowing Championships medalists